PromoCapital, founded in 2004, was to be Haiti's first investment bank and is a subsidiary of PromoBank. The bank was headquartered in Pétion-Ville, Haiti and has representative offices in Washington, D.C. and Aventura, Florida.  The firm had 70 partners, and its equity structure was that of a 50/50 joint-venture between the Haitian and the USA shareholders. The firm is served by two Chairmen: Henri Deschamps, Chairman, and PromoCapital Haiti and Dumarsais M. Siméus Chairman, PromoCapital USA.  Partners were looking for annual returns in the mid- or high teens. The entity has been inactive since inception.

References

External links
Public launch of PromoCapital

Banks of Haiti
Investment banks